Four Feather Falls is a British television programme, the third puppet TV show produced by Gerry Anderson for Granada Television (now ITV Granada). It was based on an idea by Barry Gray, who also wrote the show's music. The series was the first to use an early version of Anderson's Supermarionation puppetry. Thirty-nine 13-minute episodes were produced, broadcast by Granada from February until November 1960. The setting is the late 19th-century fictional Kansas town of Four Feather Falls, where the hero of the series, Tex Tucker, is a sheriff. The four feathers of the title refers to four magical feathers given to Tex by the Indian chief Kalamakooya as a reward for saving his grandson. One of the feathers allowed Tex's guns to swivel and fire without being touched whenever he was in danger, two conferred the power of speech on Tex's horse and dog, and the fourth feather could summon Kalamakooya.

Tex's speaking voice was provided by Nicholas Parsons, and his singing voice by Michael Holliday. The series was sporadically repeated on British television until 1968, and was released on DVD in 2005.

Production
American Western television shows such as Wagon Train and Gunsmoke were popular with British audiences, therefore Gerry Anderson and his business partner Arthur Provis decided to make a cowboy series, based on an idea offered to them by Barry Gray. Anderson considered the puppets with static heads, made by Christine Glanville for his earlier productions, to be unacceptable because the viewer could not tell which character was talking unless its puppet moved up or down. Anderson's aim was to make the puppets look as realistic as possible, the beginning of the Supermarionation puppetry process, although that term was not coined until his next series, Supercar.

The puppets' papier-mâché heads were replaced by interchangeable hollow fibre glass heads with internal rods that could move the eyes from side to side. The heads also contained sound-activated solenoids, which allowed the puppets' lips to move automatically in synchronisation with the dialogue. The electronics of the day required more space than would be available in a human-scale head, therefore all the puppets in Four Feather Falls had oversized heads.

Except for the pilot episode, which was made in AP Films' studios at Islet Park, the series was produced in a converted warehouse in the Slough Trading Estate. The cast assembled to record each script without seeing the puppets, much like recording a radio series; synchronisation of each character's speech with the movement of its puppet's mouth was performed later. The show was filmed in black and white.  Its tight budget precluded the use of sophisticated special effects, and less-costly alternatives were used. For example, to achieve the effect of muzzle flashes, small specks of black paint were carefully applied to the 35 mm negatives so they would appear as white flashes on the finished prints. The wires used to control the puppets were eight feet long and made of tungsten, an improvement on the curtain wire used in Anderson's two earlier puppet series (The Adventures of Twizzle and Torchy the Battery Boy), and were only 1/200 of an inch thick. Being shiny, the wires had to be blackened. The puppets were made one-third life size with the puppeteers on a bridge eight feet above the set. The horses moved by being pulled along on a trolley, which meant the viewer never saw their feet when they were moving.

Continuity for the series was provided by Sylvia Thamm, who later married Gerry Anderson.

Plot
The series is set in the fictitious late 19th-century Western town of Four Feather Falls, Kansas, and features the adventures of its sheriff, Tex Tucker. In the first episode, Grandpa Twink relates the story of how it all began to his grandson, Little Jake. Tex is riding up from the valley and comes across a lost and hungry Indian boy, Makooya, and saves him. Tex is given four magic feathers by the boy's grandfather, Chief Kalamakooya, as a reward for saving his grandson. Two of the feathers allow his guns to swivel and fire automatically (often while Tex's hands are raised), and the other two allow his horse, Rocky, and his dog, Dusty, to speak. As Tex, his horse, and dog are very thirsty, Kalamakooya also makes a waterfall where there had been no water before, and so when the town was built it was named after Tex's feathers and the waterfall.

The characters of the town are Grandpa Twink, who does little but rest in a chair; his grandson Little Jake, the only child in town; Ma Jones, who runs the town store; Doc Haggerty; Slim Jim, the bartender of the Denison saloon; Marvin Jackson, the bank manager; and Dan Morse, the telegraphist. Other characters appeared from time to time for only one episode, often just visiting town.  The villains included Pedro, who was introduced in the first show and Fernando, who first appeared in the second episode as a sidekick and someone Pedro could blame when things went wrong, as they always did. Big Ben was another villain who appeared from time to time, as did Red Scalp, a renegade Indian. Other villains only appeared in single episodes.

Cast
 Nicholas Parsons – Sheriff Tex Tucker (speaking voice) / Telegraph Operator Dan Morse / Various
 Michael Holliday – Sheriff Tex Tucker (singing voice) / Various
 Kenneth Connor – Dusty the Dog / Rocky the Horse / Pedro the Bandit / Big Chief Kalamakooya / Bank Manager Marvin Jackson / Doc Haggerty / Saloon Owner Slim Jim Denison / Various
 David Graham – Grandpa Ebenezer Twink / Fernando the Bandit / Big Ben the Horse Rustler Bandit / Red Scalp the Renegade Indian / Various
 Denise Bryer – Martha 'Ma' Jones / Little Jake / Makooya the Little Indian Boy / Various

Denise Bryer had worked with Anderson on The Adventures of Twizzle, and he wanted her to play some of the voices in Four Feather Falls. Anderson visited Bryer at her home with some scripts and asked her husband, Nicholas Parsons, to help by reading some of the other parts, including the sheriff Tex Tucker. Anderson liked Parsons' interpretation and offered him the job of providing Tex's speaking voice.

Music
The show's music and song lyrics were composed by Barry Gray. Michael Holliday provided Tex's singing voice, and Tommy Reilly performed the harmonica pieces. The best known song to come out of the series was "Four Feather Falls", sung in some episodes by Michael Holliday in the style of Bing Crosby and sometimes incorrectly described as the theme song to the series. The closing theme song was "Two Gun Tex of Texas." Holliday was paid £2000 for his singing work on the pilot episode, equivalent to about £38,000 as of 2010, a significant part of the show's £6000 budget. In all, Holliday recorded six songs for the series: "Four Feather Falls", "The Phantom Rider", "The Rick-Rick-A-Rackety Train", "Happy Hearts and Friendly Faces", "My Home Town", and "Two Gun Tex of Texas".

Episodes

Syndication
The series was repeated in some British TV regions on a sporadic basis up until 1968. In December 2004, it was announced that the rights had been acquired by Network, and it was released on three Region 2 DVDs in May 2005. It is the only Supermarionation series not yet released to DVD in North America as of January 2006. Sylvia Anderson wrote two British children's annuals based on the show, published by Collins in 1960 and 1961. The first book featured a short text story based on the pilot episode of the TV series.

In other media 
The show was adapted into comics form and published as an ongoing strip in Polystyle Publications' TV Comic. The Four Feathers Falls strip was drawn by Neville Main, and appeared from issue #439 (14 May 1960) until issue #564 (6 October 1962).

References
Notes

Citations

Bibliography

External links
Four Feather Falls at Nostalgia Central
Four Feather Falls at ClassicKidsTV.co.uk
Four Feather Falls at IMDb

1960s British children's television series
1960 British television series debuts
1960 British television series endings
Fiction set in the 19th century
AP Films
British children's action television series
Black-and-white British television shows
ITV children's television shows
English-language television shows
British children's fantasy television series
Marionette films
British television shows featuring puppetry
Television shows set in Kansas
1960s Western (genre) television series